Air is the sixth studio album by English contemporary R&B group Sault, released on 13 April 2022 to positive reception by critics.

Critical reception

 The editorial staff at AnyDecentMusic? scored characterized reviews as a 7.2 out of 10, with five reviews. The editors of AllMusic Guide gave Air four out of five stars, with reviewer Andy Kellman praising the group's to choral music, as well as the vocals on "Luos Higher". In The Guardian, Stevie Chick scored this release five out of five stars, calling this "boundary-breaking work for an entirely new and unexpected paradigm" after the group's funk and hip hop roots. Shy Thomas of Pitchfork Media rated Air an 83 out of 100, with the site naming it the Best New Music of the week; Thomas' review calls Air "too manifold to be easily simplified" and noting that it is an important statement about love. The same publication posted a review of the 39 best albums of 2022 so far on 13 June and included Air. For The Quietus, Nathan Evans called this album "compositions deserve Fantasia-style visuals", that still retain some of the group's R&B roots. Clashs Robin Murray dissented, with a five out of 10 review that considers this work weak compared the band's back catalogue, calling it "disappointing and listless", but "at times pretty, at others curiously appealing". Mojos Tom Doyle rated Air three out of five stars, calling it "impressive in its execution", but noting that it "too frequently tends to the bombastic". In Uncut, John Lewis assessed this release a seven out of 10 for being "a rather audacious curveball" that is "a little stiff and metronomic in places".

Track listing
"Reality" – 3:58
"Air" – 5:54
"Heart" – 3:52
"Solar" – 12:34
"Time Is Precious" – 7:03
"June 55" – 5:31
"Luos Higher" – 6:10

Chart performance

See also
List of 2022 albums

References

External links

Aggregate reviews from Album of the Year
Review from Album Reviews blog
Review from Albumism
Review from Free Style Bristol

2022 albums
Albums produced by Inflo
Sault (band) albums
Self-released albums
Classical albums by English artists